Damaris Nicole Abarca González (born 27 February 1990) is a Chilean lawyer who was elected as a member of the Chilean Constitutional Convention.

References

External links
 

Living people
1990 births
21st-century Chilean politicians
University of Chile alumni
Members of the Chilean Constitutional Convention
21st-century Chilean women politicians